Apex Learning, Inc. is a privately held provider of digital curriculum. Headquartered in Seattle, Apex Learning is accredited by AdvancED.

History
Microsoft co-founder Paul Allen founded Apex Learning in 1997 to apply for online courses and test prep to material for grades 6-12. The company initially focused on Advanced Placement courses and test prep. Within one year of operation, 200 students used the Apex platform.

In 2002, Cheryl Vedoe founder of Tenth Planet and VP of Education Marketing at Apple Inc., became CEO of Apex. That same year, it acquired Beyond Books. Apex Learning acquired Boxer Math in 2003. In 2006, Apex had a $6 million round of venture capital financing led by MK Capital.

In May 2017, Apex Learning was acquired by Education Growth Partners, however the terms for acquisition were not disclosed. The following August, Apex Learning released Tutorials for the General Education Development (GED), High School Equivalency Test (HiSET) and the Test Assessing Secondary Completion (TASC) exams. Since 2015, Apex has been approved by the College Board for Advanced Placement courses.

Controversies
The Alameda County Civil Grand Jury released a report in 2020 that questioned the use of Apex in Castlemont High School in Oakland, CA. It is suggested that Apex's on-line curriculum was used improperly to graduate students who should not have graduated.

See also
 E-Learning
 Virtual learning environment
 History of virtual learning environments
 Learning management system
 List of online high schools in Mississippi

References

External links
 Official website
 Virtual school

Software companies based in Seattle
Educational technology companies of the United States
Virtual learning environments
Software companies of the United States